European Moroccans are Moroccans whose ancestry lies within the continent of Europe.

History

Prior to independence, Morocco was home to half a million Europeans, and European Christians formed almost half the population of the city of Casablanca. Since the kingdom's independence in 1955, the European population has decreased substantially.

At the beginning of the 20th century, 250,000 Spaniards lived in Morocco. Most left Morocco after its independence and their numbers were reduced to 13,000.

See also

Pied-Noir
European Tunisian
Italian settlers in Libya

References and footnotes 

Ethnic groups in Morocco